No Chocolate Cake is the fifth studio album by power pop band Gin Blossoms. It was released on September 28, 2010, worldwide, and the first single, "Miss Disarray", was released to radio stations on August 2, 2010. The album reached #1 on Amazon.com MP3 album charts on the release date. No Chocolate Cake  entered the Billboard 200 album chart at number 73 after selling 7,000 copies in its first week of release. It was the album's peak position, after falling off the chart the following week.

"Miss Disarray" gathered a sizable amount of airplay on hot adult contemporary radio stations and reached the Top 50 on that format during late October 2010. The opening track "Don't Change for Me" is a cover of a Matthew Moon song.

Track listing
 "Don't Change for Me" (Jesse Valenzuela, Danny Wilde, Matthew Moon) – 4:05
 "I Don't Want to Lose You Now" (Valenzuela, Wilde, Brad Warren, Brett Warren) – 4:11
 "Miss Disarray" (Valenzuela, Wilde, Graham Colton) – 3:30
 "Wave Bye Bye" (Robin Wilson) – 4:07
 "I'm Ready" (Valenzuela, Wilson, Wilde, Sue Sandberg) – 4:22
 "Somewhere Tonight" (Valenzuela, Wilde) – 3:56
 "Go Crybaby" (Wilson) – 5:00
 "If You'll Be Mine" (Valenzuela) – 3:14
 "Dead or Alive on the 405" (Valenzuela, Craig Northey) – 3:02
 "Something Real" (Wilson, Jamie Woolford) – 4:03
 "Goin' to California" (Scott Johnson, Wilson) – 3:44
iTunes Store bonus track
"Please Don't Ask Me"

References

External links
Gin Blossoms
Gin Blossoms Return With 429 Records Debut 'NO CHOCOLATE CAKE'
The Gin Blossoms Return with a New Album
 

Gin Blossoms albums
2010 albums
429 Records albums